The 2012 European Rowing Championships is the sixth edition of the European Rowing Championships, since they were reinstated by decision of FISA in 2006. The event was held in Varese, Italy, between 14 and 16 September 2012.

Medal summary

Men

Women

Medal table

References

External links
 

2012 in rowing
2012
International sports competitions hosted by Italy
2012 in Italian sport
2012 in European sport
Rowing competitions in Italy
Sport in Varese